Electroatopos castaneus is an extinct species of ant-like stone beetle, described in 2010, and the only species in the genus Electroatopos. It existed in what is now Myanmar during the Middle Cretaceous period.

References

Staphylinidae genera
Cretaceous insects
Fossil taxa described in 2010
Cretaceous insects of Asia
Burmese amber
Fossils of Myanmar